Richard Coke (1829–1897) was an American lawyer and politician who served as the 15th Governor of Texas.

Richard Coke may also refer to:

Richard Coke Jr. (1790–1851), Virginia congressman
Richard Toby Coke (born 1954), English politician

See also
Richard Koch, British management consultant, venture capitalist and author